Lavirotte may refer to:

 Jules Lavirotte (1864–1929), French architect
 Lavirotte Building, apartment building in Paris
 Audibert & Lavirotte, French automobile